Judy Diduck (born April 21, 1966) is a Canadian retired ice hockey player and former member of the Canadian national ice hockey team. In 2005, she was inducted into the Ringette Hall of Fame. Diduck was born in Edmonton, Alberta, but grew up in Sherwood Park, Alberta.

Playing career

Ice hockey
Diduck also played for the Edmonton Chimos. She played with the Chimos at the 1998 Esso Nationals and scored a goal in the bronze medal game. The Chimos would finish the tournament in fourth place. Her final international tournament was the 1998 Winter Olympics, where women's ice hockey was being contested officially for the first time. After retiring from Team Canada, she entered the University of Alberta. As a student, she played for the University of Alberta Pandas women's ice hockey program. Since 2005 she has worked as an assistant coach for the Pandas team.

Ringette
Diduck was one of the first players to join ringette when the sport was first introduced to Alberta in Sherwood Park. From 1979 to 1983, Judy competed in the first five consecutive Canadian Ringette Championships and she also played on the gold medal winning Team Alberta in the first World Ringette Championships in 1990 (which resulted in her being inducted in the Ringette Canada Hall of Fame in 2005 as a team member).

Personal life

Her brother, Gerald Diduck played in the National Hockey League.

Career stats

Awards and honours
Team Alberta Most Sportsmanlike Player, 2000 Esso Women's Nationals
Judy Diduck, 2003 CIS Second Team All-Canadian
Judy Diduck, 2004 CIS First Team All-Canadian
 Ringette Canada Hall of Fame inductee 2005 (as a team member)

References

1966 births
Living people
Canadian women's ice hockey defencemen
Ringette players
Edmonton Chimos players
Ice hockey people from Edmonton
Sportspeople from Sherwood Park
Ice hockey players at the 1998 Winter Olympics
Medalists at the 1998 Winter Olympics
Olympic ice hockey players of Canada
Olympic medalists in ice hockey
Olympic silver medalists for Canada
Alberta Pandas women's ice hockey players